Cell Press is an all-science publisher of over 50 scientific journals across the life, physical, earth, and health sciences, both independently and in partnership with scientific societies. Many of Cell Press's journals are among the most reputable in their fields. Cell Press was founded and is currently based in Cambridge, MA, and has offices across the United States, Europe, and Asia under its parent company Elsevier.

History 
Benjamin Lewin founded Cell in January 1974, under the aegis of MIT Press. He then bought the title and established an independent Cell Press in 1986. The company spun off new journals as follows: Neuron in March 1988; Immunity in April 1994; and Molecular Cell in December 1997. Benjamin Lewin left in October 1999, after having sold Cell Press to Elsevier the previous April.

Since that time, Cell Press has launched a number of new titles: Developmental Cell in July 2001; Cancer Cell in February 2002; Cell Metabolism in January 2005; Cell Host & Microbe in March 2007; Cell Stem Cell in July 2007; Cell Systems in July 2015; Heliyon 2015; Chem in July 2016; Joule in September 2017; iScience in March 2018;  and One Earth in September 2019. Cell Genomics was added in 2021.

Meanwhile, three additional Elsevier journals have joined the Cell Press group: Current Biology launched in January 1996, which became part of Cell Press in early 2001; Structure launched in 1993, which merged with the journal Folding & Design in early 1999. At that point, the name changed to Structure with Folding & Design but reverted to Structure at the beginning of 2001, when the journal joined Cell Press. Cell Chemical Biology (formerly titled Chemistry & Biology) launched on April 15, 1994, and joined Cell Press in January 2002. In 2007, Cell Press acquired the Trends family of journals, 16 review journals covering the life, physical, and medical sciences.

In October 1995, Cell.com was launched and full-text online versions were launched in July 1997.

Open Access 
Cell Press published its first open access journal, Cell Reports, in 2012. In January 2021, all Cell Press journals began offering open access publishing options.  As of May 2022, Cell Press publishes 17 open access journals and 40 hybrid journals. In 2021, 50% of all articles published in Cell Press were open access.

Landmark Papers 
The hallmarks of cancer – Cell, Hanahan & Weinberg (2001), https://www.cell.com/cell/fulltext/S0092-8674(00)81683-9

Hallmarks of cancer: The next generation – Cell, Hanahan & Weinberg (2011), https://www.cell.com/cell/fulltext/S0092-8674(11)00127-9

MicroRNAs: Genomics, Biogenesis, Mechanism, and Function – Cell, Voinnet (2009), https://www.cell.com/cell/fulltext/S0092-8674(09)00128-7

Induction of Pluripotent Stem Cells from Mouse Embryonic and Adult Fibroblast Cultures by Defined Factors – Cell, Takashi & Yamanaka (2006),https://www.cell.com/cell/fulltext/S0092-8674(06)00976-7

Induction of Pluripotent Stem Cells from Adult Human Fibroblasts by Defined Factors – Cell, Takahashi et al. (2007), https://www.cell.com/cell/fulltext/S0092-8674(07)01471-7

Matrix Elasticity Directs Stem Cell Lineage Specification – Cell, Engler et al. (2007), https://www.cell.com/cell/fulltext/S0092-8674(06)00961-5

The C. elegans heterochronic gene lin-4 encodes small RNAs with antisense complementarity to lin-14 – Cell, Lee, Feinbaum & Ambros (1993),  https://www.cell.com/cell/fulltext/0092-8674(93)90529-Y

Innovations 
In 2016 Cell Press launched STAR Methods. STAR (Structured Transparent Accessible Reporting) Methods is focused on making replicable research methods available.

Advocacy 
In 2020, Cell Press launched the Rising Black Scientist Awards. Winning essays are published in Cell, and winners receive a $10,000 award. Source:  The 2021 winners were Charleese Williams and Elle Lett. The 2020 winners were Olufolakemi Olusanya and Chrystal Starbird.

Journals Published

Research Journals 

 Cell
 Cancer Cell
 Cell Chemical Biology
 Cell Genomics
 Cell Host & Microbe
 Cell Metabolism
 Cell Reports
 Cell Reports Medicine
 Cell Reports Methods
 Cell Reports Physical Science
 Cell Stem Cell
 Cell Systems
 Chem
 Chem Catalysis
 Current Biology
 Developmental Cell
 Heliyon
 Immunity
 iScience
 Joule
 Matter
 Med
 Molecular Cell
 Neuron
 One Earth
 Patterns
 STAR Protocols
 Structure

Trends reviews journals 

 Biochemical Sciences
 Biotechnology
 Cancer
 Cell Biology
 Chemistry
 Cognitive Sciences
 Ecology & Evolution
 Endocrinology & Metabolism
 Genetics
 Immunology
 Microbiology
 Molecular Medicine
 Neurosciences
 Parasitology
 Pharmacological Sciences
 Plant Science

Partner journals 

 AJHG
 Biophysical Journal
 Biophysical Reports
 EBioMedicine
 HGG Advances
 Molecular Plant
 Molecular Therapy family
 Plant Communications
 Stem Cell Reports
 The Innovation

See also 
 Journals published by Cell Press

References

External links 
 
https://en.wikipedia.org/wiki/Paint

Publishing companies of the United States
Companies based in Massachusetts
Publishing companies established in 1986
Elsevier imprints
1986 establishments in Massachusetts